Huascacocha (possibly from Quechua waskha (also waska) rope, qucha lake,) is a lake in Peru located in the Junín Region, Yauli Province, Carhuacayan District.

In 2012 the Huascacocha dam was inaugurated. The dam lies was erected at the southeastern end of the lake.

See also
List of lakes in Peru

References

INEI, Compendio Estadistica 2007, page 26

Lakes of Peru
Lakes of Junín Region
Dams in Peru
Buildings and structures in Junín Region